Phosphatidylinositol 3-kinase regulatory subunit gamma is an enzyme, which in humans is encoded by the PIK3R3 gene.

Interactions
PIK3R3 has been shown to interact with Insulin-like growth factor 1 receptor, IRS1 and Retinoblastoma protein.

References

Further reading